Dragoljub Radulović (born 20 March 1964) is a Serbian judoka. He competed in the men's half-middleweight event at the 1996 Summer Olympics.

References

1964 births
Living people
Serbian male judoka
Olympic judoka of Yugoslavia
Judoka at the 1996 Summer Olympics
Place of birth missing (living people)